Michele Marsh may refer to:
 Michele Marsh (reporter) (1954–2017), American news journalist and television anchor
 Michele Marsh (actress) (born 1946), American actress

See also
 Michelle Marsh (born 1982), singer and former glamour model